Judson is an unincorporated community in Cumberland County, North Carolina, U.S.A.

References

 

Unincorporated communities in Cumberland County, North Carolina
Unincorporated communities in North Carolina